Ho Wai-On (Ann-Kay Lin) (born 1946, Hong Kong) is an Anglo-Chinese composer.

Biography
Ann-Kay Lin grew up in Hong Kong, and studied at the Royal Academy of Music in London on a John Swire Scholarship. She studied singing and composition, and piano with Max Pirani. A wrist injury ended her career as a concert pianist, and she turned to composition instead.

Ann-Kay Lin is included in the British Music Collection online.

Works
Ann-Kay Lin has composed for dance, ballet, chamber ensemble, instrumental and voice performance. Selected works include:

Sakura Variations (1974 revised 2000)
Four Love Songs in Chinese (1974 revised 2000)
Permutation (1996)
Tai Chi (1977)
To You (1977 revised 2000)
Farewell, My Beloved (1982)
Bulldozers, Old House and Old Banyan (1990 revised 1999)
Let’s Sing "Magic Banyan Tree" (2002)

Her compositions have been recorded and issued on CD, including:
Music is Happiness Audio CD

References

1946 births
Living people
20th-century classical composers
Hong Kong women classical composers
Hong Kong classical composers
Alumni of the Royal Academy of Music
20th-century women composers